The ConScript Unicode Registry is a discontinued volunteer project to coordinate the assignment of code points in the Unicode Private Use Areas (PUA) for the encoding of artificial scripts including those for constructed languages. It was founded by John Cowan and was maintained by him and Michael Everson but has not been updated since 2008 and is no longer actively maintained. It has no formal connection with the Unicode Consortium. Since the discontinuation of the CSUR, a project named the Under-ConScript Unicode Registry has maintained the addition of and updates to scripts in the registry, including Cirth and Toki Pona.

Scripts
The CSUR includes the following scripts:

Font support
Some fonts support ConScript Unicode specified code points:
 Constructium, a proportional font based on SIL Gentium.
 Fairfax HD, a monospaced font intended for text editors and terminals.
 GNU Unifont, a bitmap font intended as a fallback font, includes CSUR and UCSUR characters in the separate Unifont CSUR package.
 Horta
 Kurinto Font Folio

See also
 Medieval Unicode Font Initiative

References

External links
 ConScript Unicode Registry (old)
 Under-ConScript Unicode Registry (new)

Unicode
Constructed languages
Information technology organizations
Computer-related introductions in 1993